Dr. Henry Jonathan "Hank" Pym is a  character appearing in American comic books published by Marvel Comics. Created by penciller Jack Kirby, editor-plotter Stan Lee and writer Larry Lieber, the character first appeared in Tales to Astonish #27 (January 1962). He returned several issues later as the original iteration of Ant-Man, a superhero with the power to shrink to the size of an ant. Later, Pym goes on to assume other superhero identities, including the also size-changing Giant-Man and Goliath; the insect-themed Yellowjacket; and briefly the Wasp. He is a founding member of the Avengers superhero team as well as the creator of the robotic villain Ultron.

Since his debut during the Silver Age of Comic Books, Hank Pym has been featured in several Marvel-endorsed products such as animated films, video games, and television series. Michael Douglas plays the character in the Marvel Cinematic Universe films Ant-Man (2015), Ant-Man and the Wasp (2018), Avengers: Endgame (2019), and Ant-Man and the Wasp: Quantumania (2023). Additionally, Douglas voiced alternate timeline versions in the Disney+ animated series What If...? (2021).

Publication history

Hank Pym debuted in a seven-page solo cover story titled "The Man in the Ant Hill" (about a character who tests shrinking technology on himself) in the science fiction/fantasy anthology Tales to Astonish #27 (cover date January 1962). The creative team was editor-plotter Stan Lee, writer Larry Lieber, penciller Jack Kirby, and inker Dick Ayers, with Lee stating in 2008: "I did one comic book called 'The Man in the Ant Hill' about a guy who shrunk down and there were ants or bees chasing him. That sold so well that I thought making him into a superhero might be fun."

As a result, Pym was revived eight issues later as the costumed superhero Ant-Man who starred in the 13-page, the three-chapter story "Return of the Ant-Man/An Army of Ants/The Ant-Man's Revenge" in Tales to Astonish #35 (September 1962). The character's adventures became an ongoing feature in the title. Issue #44 (June 1963) featured the debut of his socialite girlfriend and laboratory assistant Janet van Dyne. Janet adopted the costumed identity of the Wasp and co-starred in Pym's subsequent appearances in Tales to Astonish. Wasp also on occasion acted as a framing-sequence host for backup stories in the title. In September 1963, Lee and Kirby created the superhero title The Avengers, and Ant-Man and Wasp were established in issue #1 as founding members of the team.

Decades later, Lee theorized as to why "Ant-Man never became one of our top sellers or had his own book," saying,

Pym began what would be a constant shifting of superhero identities in Tales to Astonish, becoming the  Giant-Man in issue #49 (November 1963). Pym and van Dyne continued to costar in the title until issue #69 (July 1965), while simultaneously appearing in The Avengers until issue #15 (April 1965), after which the couple temporarily left the team.

Pym rejoined the Avengers and adopted the new identity Goliath in Avengers #28 (May 1966). Gradually falling to mental strain, he adopted the fourth superhero identity Yellowjacket in issue #59 (December 1968). Pym reappeared as Ant-Man in Avengers #93 (November 1971) and for issues #4–10 starred in the lead story of the first volume of Marvel Feature (July 1972July 1973). During this run, he appeared in a redesigned costume with a nail as a weapon. After appearing occasionally as Yellowjacket in the 1980s and battling mental and emotional issues, Pym would temporarily abandon his costumed persona. Pym joined the West Coast Avengers as a scientist and inventor in West Coast Avengers vol. 2, #21 (June 1987). The character returned to the Avengers as Giant-Man in The Avengers vol. 3, #1 (February 1998). When the team disbanded after a series of tragedies, Pym, using the Yellowjacket persona again, took a leave of absence beginning with vol. 3, #85 (September 2004).

Following the death of van Dyne, a grieving Pym took on yet another superhero identity as a new iteration of Wasp, in tribute to the woman he had married and divorced by this time, in the one-shot publication Secret Invasion: Requiem (January 2009). Giant-Man appeared as a supporting character in Avengers Academy from issue #1 (August 2010) through its final issue #39 (January 2013).  Pym returned as the Wasp in the mini-series Ant-Man & The Wasp (January 2011) and also appeared as a regular character in the 2010-2013 Secret Avengers series from issue #22 (April 2012) through its final issue #37 (March 2013).

After Secret Avengers, Pym joined the Avengers A.I. after beating his creation Ultron. Then he appeared in many comic books like Daredevil (Vol. 3 and 4) and the graphic novel Rage of Ultron.

Fictional character biography

1960s 
Biochemist Dr. Henry "Hank" Pym discovers an unusual set of subatomic particles he labels "Pym particles". Entrapping these within two separate serums, he creates a size-altering formula and a reversal formula, testing them on himself. Reduced to the size of an insect, he becomes trapped in an anthill before he eventually escapes and uses the reversal formula to restore himself to his normal size. Deciding the serums are too dangerous to exist, he destroys them. Shortly afterwards, he reconsiders his decision and recreates his serums. Pym's experience in the anthill inspires him to study ants, and he constructs a cybernetic helmet that allows him to communicate with and control them. Pym designs a costume made of unstable molecules to prevent bites or scratches from the ants and reinvents himself as the superhero Ant-Man.

After several adventures, Pym is contacted by Dr. Vernon van Dyne asking for aid in contacting alien life. Pym refuses but is attracted to Vernon's socialite daughter Janet van Dyne. Vernon is subsequently killed by an alien criminal who teleports himself to Earth, and Janet soon asks for Pym's help in avenging Vernon's death. Pym reveals his secret identity to Janet and uses Pym particles to graft wasp wings beneath her shoulders, which appear when Janet shrinks. Janet assumes the alias of the Wasp, and together they find and defeat Vernon's killer. The pair become founding members of the superhero team known as the Avengers.

Pym eventually adopts his first alternate identity as the 12-foot-tall Giant-Man. (In comics three decades later, a flashback presents Pym as adopting the Giant-Man identity at that time out of feelings of inadequacy when compared to powerful teammates Iron Man and Thor.) Pym and the Wasp develop a romantic relationship.  Shortly afterward, Pym and van Dyne take a leave of absence from the Avengers.

Pym adopts a new superhero identity, "Goliath", upon his return to the Avengers. A mishap traps the character in giant form for several issues and affects his self-esteem. After regaining control of his size-shifting ability, Pym creates the robot Ultron that accidentally achieves sentience and becomes one of the Avengers's greatest foes. During a botched experiment, Pym accidentally inhales chemicals that induce changes in his mind, manifesting as a personality crisis. Suffering from the chemicals' effects, he reappears at Avengers Mansion in the cocky new persona of Yellowjacket and claims to have disposed of Pym. Only the Wasp realizes that Yellowjacket is Pym. She takes advantage of his offer of marriage. Pym eventually recovers from the chemicals during a battle with the Circus of Crime at the wedding.

1970s 

After several adventures with the Avengers, including another encounter with Ultron, the pair take another leave of absence. The heroes re-encounter Hank Pym at the beginning of the Kree-Skrull War, and once again as the Ant-Man persona and has a series of solo adventures.

After aiding fellow superhero team known as the Defenders as Yellowjacket, Pym returns to the Avengers. He is eventually captured by an upgraded Ultron that brainwashes his creator, causing the character to regress to his original Ant-Man costume and personality — arriving at Avengers Mansion, thinking it to be the very first meeting of the team. Seeing several unfamiliar members, Pym attacks the team until stopped by the Wasp. After Ultron's brainwashing is reversed, Pym rejoins the Avengers as Yellowjacket. Pym is forced to briefly leave the team when the roster is restructured by government liaison Henry Peter Gyrich.

Also at this time, he noticed Scott Lang's theft of the Ant-Man suit. After Darren Cross's defeat and aware of Lang's use of the stolen goods, Pym let Lang keep the equipment, albeit only to uphold the law.

1980s 

Returning 14 issues later, Hank Pym participates in several missions until, after demonstrating hostile behavior toward Janet van Dyne, he attacks a foe from behind once the opponent had ceased fighting. Captain America suspends Yellowjacket from Avengers duty pending the verdict of a court-martial.

Pym suffers a mental breakdown and concocts a plan to salvage his credibility. He plans to build a robot and program it to launch an attack on the Avengers; Pym will then counter the false flag attack at a critical moment using his knowledge of the robot's weaknesses, thereby presenting himself as the other Avengers' savior. The Wasp discovers the plan and begs Pym to stop, whereupon he strikes her.

Pym is subsequently expelled from the Avengers, and Janet divorces him.

Left penniless, Pym is manipulated by an old foe, the presumed-dead Egghead, who tricks Pym into stealing the national reserve of the metal adamantium. Pym is confronted by the Avengers and blamed for the theft, as Egghead erases all evidence of his own involvement. Pym, in turn, blames Egghead, a criminal still believed dead by the other Avengers. This is taken by Pym's former teammates as further proof of his madness, and he is incarcerated. During Pym's imprisonment, Janet has a brief relationship with Tony Stark. Egghead later attempts to kill Pym but is himself accidentally killed by Hawkeye. With the perpetrator of the original theft now exposed, Pym is cleared of all charges. After bidding farewell to Janet and his teammates, Pym leaves to devote himself full-time to research.

Pym reappears as a member of the West Coast Avengers, first in an advisory role, then as a full member. He answers to "Doctor Pym" in the field, using none of the names or costumes associated with his previous superhero identities. He begins a short relationship with teammate Tigra. After being taunted by old foe Whirlwind, Pym contemplates suicide, but is stopped by Firebird. Pym and Janet eventually resume a romantic relationship.

1990s 
The character returns to the Avengers, joining the East Coast team as Giant-Man. The pair, together with many of the other Avengers, apparently sacrifice themselves to stop the villain Onslaught, but actually exist in a pocket universe for a year before returning to the mainstream Marvel Universe.

Hank Pym returns and aids the team as Giant-Man, and makes a significant contribution by defeating criminal mastermind Imus Champion and his flawed creation Ultron, simultaneously overcoming his old issues of guilt over Ultron's crimes.

2000s 
During the Destiny War between Kang the Conqueror and Immortus, two versions of Hank Pym are drawn in: Giant-Man of the present and Yellowjacket immediately prior to his marriage to Janet van Dyne. Yellowjacket briefly betrays the team to Immortus and the powerful Time-Keepers try to create a timeline where he will not turn back into Pym, but he rejects this decision in time to help his allies. Observing the final battle, Libra—who brought the team together by using the Destiny Force to tap into his subconscious awareness of the cosmic balance—reflects that both Pyms were necessary so that Yellowjacket's betrayal could bring the team into the right position to attack the Time-Keepers, while Pym's presence as Giant-Man both provided a stable support and irritated Yellowjacket to provoke his own actions.

Back in the present, an encounter with Kulan Gath results in Pym being split into his two personas of Pym and Yellowjacket, after a spell cast by Gath temporarily transforms Pym into a swashbuckler-style Yellowjacket, followed by the Yellowjacket persona manifesting a physical presence from the extradimensional bio-mass Pym uses to grow. Yellowjacket's stability deteriorates in a confrontation with Diablo. The two personalities are restored when the Wasp helps the two halves realize they need each other. Pym is eventually able to resolve his problems and adopts his Yellowjacket persona again.

After the events of the "Avengers Disassembled" storyline, Pym takes a leave of absence, and in the one-shot Avengers: Finale, he and Janet leave for England to rekindle their relationship.

As Yellowjacket, Pym is a central character in the Civil War storyline, joining those heroes that support the Superhuman Registration Act. At the conclusion of the Civil War, Pym is named "Man of the Year" by Time magazine for his role in freeing several captive anti-registration heroes. Pym becomes one of the administrators at Camp Hammond, a U.S. military base in Stamford, Connecticut, for the training of registered superheroes in the government program The Initiative. Pym and Janet's relationship fails, and Pym again begins a romantic relationship with teammate Tigra.

Following the publication of Civil War, Marvel's Secret Invasion storyline uses flashbacks to present the then-current version of the character as an impostor who replaced the real Pym at some point in the books' fictional history prior to the events of Civil War. This impostor is an extraterrestrial of the shape-shifting Skrull race participating in a covert invasion of Earth; Pym's experiences throughout the Civil War series and related series are retold in brief from the perspective of the impostor and its allies. The impostor is exposed and defeated by the hero Crusader. After the final battle between Earth's heroes and the Skrulls, Pym is found with other "replaced" heroes in a Skrull vessel. When Janet is seemingly killed in battle, Pym takes on a new superhero persona, the Wasp, in tribute to her. He rejoins the Avengers and eventually leads the team.

The cosmic entity Eternity reveals to Pym that he is Earth's "Scientist Supreme", the scientific counterpart to Earth's Sorcerer Supreme. The Norse trickster-god Loki later claims to have been posing as Eternity in order to manipulate Pym.

2010s

Hank Pym creates Avengers Academy, a program to help train young people with newly acquired superpowers. Pym returns to his Giant-Man identity. Pym later joins the superhero team known as the Secret Avengers. When a future version of Pym's sentient robot Ultron conquers the world of the present in the "Age of Ultron" storyline, a time-travel plan involving Wolverine and the Invisible Woman succeeds in having the past Pym make a change in his creation of Ultron, which destroys the robot with a computer virus.

Pym and Monica Chang, A.I. Division Chief of the espionage agency S.H.I.E.L.D., assemble a new team called the Avengers A.I., consisting of Pym, Victor Mancha (his "grandson" by way of Ultron), the Vision, and a Doombot. The team is later joined by Alexis, who is eventually revealed to be one of six sentient A.I.s to be spawned from the Ultron virus along with Dimitrios. Months later, Pym, again using the Yellowjacket identity, is shown as a member of the Illuminati.

Later, an accident merges Pym and Ultron during Ultron's latest attack. The hybrid human/machine eventually abandons Earth. A funeral service is held in Pym's honor, and Scott Lang receives one of Hank's labs.

Pym apparently resurfaces after helping the crew of a spaceship under attack. Ultron is now Pym's armor rather than being merged seemingly. Back on Earth, he rejoins the Avengers, but his teammates and others discover Ultron has gained control and is impersonating Pym. The Avengers end up defeating the hybrid by plunging into the sun, but both Hank and Ultron survive and continue to do battle with one another internally.

Hank is later presented as having fathered a daughter Nadia through his ex-wife Maria Trovaya, and Nadia becomes the latest Wasp. It is also revealed by Janet to Nadia that Hank has bipolar disorder. It had been discussed in Avengers A.I. that Hank was aware of his disorder and was monitoring it himself to predict when and how often his mood swings may occur.

During the "Secret Empire" storyline, Pym had set up a base in an unidentified forest in Alaska. Upon being alerted by the approach of Sam Wilson's task force by a robot version of Edwin Jarvis, Ultron Pym decides to give his "family" a warm welcome. When Tony Stark A.I.'s team and the Hydra Supreme Steve Rogers alongside Hydra's Avengers confront each other, they are captured by Pym who forces both teams to sit at a dinner table. Pym argues that he is doing this because the Avengers have become less of a family over the years as so many of them jump to obey Captain America or Iron Man despite past experience confirming that this should be a bad idea. Tony Stark's A.I. counters that the only reason the team failed as a family was because of Pym's attack on Wasp. Outraged, Ultron Pym nearly attacks the other heroes, but Scott Lang is able to talk him down by arguing that Hank Pym remains his own inspiration. Ultron Pym allows Tony Stark A.I.'s team to leave with the Cosmic Cube fragment, arguing that he will leave Hydra Supreme's plans with Hydra alone as it appears to be the best chance for world peace.

After discovering that the Infinity Stones were reformed back into the Universe, Pym decided to collect them all. He sends the aliens he had infected with his virus to take the Space Stone from Wolverine while he himself went to claim the Soul Stone. The aliens eventually failed at their task, but Ultron Pym was able to steal the Soul Gem from Magus after ruthlessly killing him. However, unbeknownst to Ultron Pym, once he claimed the Soul Stone, the fragment of Hank Pym's soul entered the Soul World where he was greeted by Gamora's soul fragment, who revealed to him that he was going to be trapped there forever. Soon afterwards, the fragment of Hank's soul encounters and battles a Soul World monster known as Devondra who trapped Hank in the silk it generates. This silk creates a deluding dream which made Hank believe that he had escaped the Soul World and reunited himself with the Avengers. Devondra then devours Hank's soul fragment under the watch of Gamora's soul fragment.

As Pym is using Saiph as his base of operations and plans to unleash the Ultron Virus on a cosmic scale, the Silver Surfer goes to look for Galactus. Even though Galactus is no longer a world-eater, the Silver Surfer informs him of what is happening and asks for his help to stop Pym's plot. However, Ultron Pym had already launched rockets filled with the Ultron Virus in order to infect the entire galaxy while saving Earth as his last target. Galactus initially refuses to consume Saiph due to the consequences of destroying it until he agrees with the Silver Surfer. This results in Saiph and the rockets transporting the Ultron Virus being destroyed. Ultron Pym got wounded in the escape and Adam Warlock claims the Soul Gem.

During "The Ultron Agenda" arc, Ultron/Hank Pym returned to Earth with plans to merge robots with humans like how Hank Pym became merged with Ultron so that he can make the ultimate lifeform. In addition, he started to call this form "Ultron Pym". After testing it on some people and some experiments on Wonder Man and Vision, Ultron Pym planned to make a fusion of Jocasta and Wasp. Iron Man and Machine Man interfered with the resulting battle causing Iron Man to be molecularly bonded to the Ultronbuster armor. The combined efforts of Stark Unlimited enabled them to create an atomic separator that separated Tony Stark from the Ultronbuster armor and Wonder Man from Vision. Ultron Pym prepared to take revenge on Iron Man. This led to Iron Man revealing what he discovered about the human and robot fusion. The person who merged with it has died and that the robot can only simulate their personality. In other words, Hank Pym was long dead when he accidentally merged with Ultron. Learning about this and not wanting to risk proving Iron Man's point by having the atomic separator used on him, Ultron surrendered to Iron Man knowing that Hank is dead.

2020s
The Ant-Man miniseries in 2022 to celebrate the character's sixtieth anniversary sees an early Hank Pym being pulled into the future, along with Eric O'Grady (from just after he stole the suit) and Scott Lang (of the 'present') to assist the Ant-Man of the 25th century, Doctor Zayn Asghar, in battling All-Father Ultron (from the miniseries Ultron Forever), who has escaped his destruction and is trying to pull himself back together. While this Ultron still attempts to claim that he is merged with the Hank Pym of his present, Scott Lang dismisses that, observing that if there was anything of Hank Pym in Ultron he would have used the power of the All-Father to separate himself from Ultron. Ultron is ultimately defeated once again and the other Ant-Men are returned to the past.

Powers and abilities

Hank Pym is a scientific genius with PhDs in biochemistry and nanotechnology and expertise in the fields of quantum physics, robotics/cybernetics, artificial intelligence, and entomology. Pym discovered the subatomic "Pym particles" that enable mass to be shunted or gained from an alternate dimension, thereby changing the size of himself or other beings or objects. Pym is the creator of the robot Ultron, whom he created as an experiment after examining Dragon Man, showing his knack for AI and cybernetics.

After constant experimentation with size-changing via ingested capsules and particle-filled gas, Pym is eventually able to change size at will, and mentally generate Pym particles to change the sizes of other living beings or inanimate objects. Pym retains his normal strength when "ant" size, and possesses greatly increased strength and stamina when in "giant" form, courtesy of the increased mass. Pym's costume is synthetic stretch fabric composed of unstable molecules and automatically adapts to his shifting sizes.

Pym also uses a cybernetic helmet he created for achieving rudimentary communication with ants and other higher order insects. As Yellowjacket, then later as Wasp, Pym wears artificial wings and has bio-blasters called "stingers" built into his gloves. He took up the Wasp mantle in memory of Janet, who was believed to be dead at the time.

Pym also carries a variety of weaponry, provisions, and scientific instruments, which are shrunken to the size of microchips and stored in the pockets of his uniform. An experienced superhero, Pym is a skilled hand-to-hand fighter.  In his first appearance, he claimed to be a master of judo, is skilled in wrestling and karate and has since been seen in combat with opponents of both his own size and radically larger than himself (as a result of his size-changing abilities).

During his stay with the West Coast Avengers, Pym constructed a one-man vehicle with artificial intelligence named Rover. Rover is able to communicate with Pym and is capable of flight and discharging energy and acid.

Back with the Avengers main team, he built a second Rover, resembling an Avengers Quinjet.

After fusing with Ultron, he now contains all of his creation's abilities when he is in control.

Successors
There are a number of characters in the Marvel universe that have also used the "Pym particles" to effect size changing. These include Janet van Dyne, Clint Barton, Bill Foster, Scott Lang, Erik Josten, Rita DeMara, Cassandra "Cassie" Lang, Eric O'Grady, Tom Foster, Shang-Chi, Raz Malhotra and Nadia Pym. Although they do not use their powers for altering their size, both Wonder Man and Vision derive their powers from Pym particles.

Enemies

The following are the known enemies of Hank Pym in any of his aliases:

 Absorbing Man - A powerful enemy that can absorb the properties of everything he touches.
 A.I.M. - A scientific community that tried to recruit and kill Hank Pym in different occasions.
 Alkhema - an artificial intelligence born to be the second wife of Ultron. She has the brain patterns of the Avenger Mockingbird.
 Atlas - Erik Josten is a supervillain that can shrink or grow his own size. He also used the Goliath persona during his permanence in the Masters of Evil.
 Black Knight - A scientist who made knight-based technology after being denied the Ebony Blade.
 Dimitrios - A supervillain artificial intelligence created by Pym himself to destroy Ultron only to take a life of its own afterwards.
 Doctor Nemesis - A supervillain with the ability to shrink and grow in size just like Ant-Man.
 Egghead - A mad scientist with an egg-shaped head.
 Hijacker - An armored car company owner who became a car thief.
 Kraglin - An A-Chiltarian that assisted his kind in controlling a Cyclops robot to capture some human specimens.
 Kulla - The dictator of the dimension of Dehnock.
 Liso Trago - A jazz musician from India who uses a special trumpet to control people. Ant-Man and Wasp turned his music against him causing Trago to forget his criminal intention and resume his career as a jazz musician.
 Living Eraser - An alien from Dimension Z whose Dimensionizer can transport anything to Dimension Z.
 Magician - A stage magician who used his stage acts in his crimes.
 MODAM - An alternate female version of MODOK who was originally supposed to be a revived Maria Trovaya. She is later revealed to be the mother of Hank's daughter Nadia prior to becoming MODAM.
 People's Defense Force - A team of Eastern European super-powered beings who had fought Hank Pym individually before coming together.
 Beasts of Berlin - A group of western lowland gorillas mutated to human intelligence by Communist scientists and speech. They operate as a team.
 El Toro - El Toro is Cuba's first super agent and an early opponent of Henry Pym.
 Madame X - Madame X is a patriot and spy for the communist Hungarian government.
 Scarlet Beetles - The Scarlet Beetles are normal beetles that have been mutated to a size of 10-feet and given human intelligence and speech.
 Voice - A supervillain whose voice enables him to control anyone.
 Pilai - A Kosmonian criminal that was accidentally brought to Earth by Vernon van Dyne.
 Porcupine - A porcupine-themed villain.
 Protector - A jewelry store owner who adopted the Protector alias to extort his rivals.
 Time Master - Elias Weems is an elderly scientist who made an aging ray after having been fired from the Modern Scientific Research Company. After being defeated by Ant-Man when he realized that his visiting grandson Tommy was in the crowd that he aged, Weems was exonerated after Ant-Man and the Modern Scientific Research Company's owner persuaded the judge to waive the charges. Afterwards, Elias got his job back and showed Tommy around his place of work.
 Ultron - A robot created by Hank Pym that obtained sentience.
 Whirlwind - A mutant that can spin at supersonic speeds.

Reception

Accolades 

 In 2011, IGN ranked Hank Pym 67th in their "Top 100 Comic Book Heroes" list.
 In 2011, Wizard Magazine ranked Hank Pym 93rd in their "Top 200 Comic book Characters" list.
 In 2015, IGN ranked Hank Pym 16th in their "Top 50 Avengers" list.
 In 2020, CBR.com ranked Hank Pym 4th in their "10 Most Powerful Members Of The Pym Family" list and  6th in their "10 Best Superhero Doctors In Marvel & DC" list.
 In 2022, Newsarama ranked Hank Pym 11th in their "Best Avengers members of all time" list.
 In 2022, Screen Rant included Hank Pym in their "9 Strongest West Coast Avengers" list.
 In 2022, CBR.com ranked Hank Pym 5th in their "10 Smartest Marvel Scientists" list and  8th in their "10 Smartest Tech-Powered Heroes" list.

Other versions

Marvel 1602
In the world of Marvel 1602, natural philosopher Henri le Pym is forced by Baron von Octavius to devise a serum that would cure him of a fatal disease. Pym is married to Janette.

The Last Avengers Story
In an alternate future in the miniseries The Last Avengers Story #1-2 (November 1995), Ultron wishes for a decisive victory over the Avengers. After eliminating the team, he has Hank Pym gather a new group. After recruiting other heroes and mercenaries, Pym leads them to victory though fatalities are heavy on both sides.

Marvel Zombies
Hank Pym is featured in several of the Marvel Zombies miniseries, appearing as one of the cannibalistic zombies in Marvel Zombies #1-5 (February–June 2006), Marvel Zombies 2 #1-5 (December 2007April 2008) and Marvel Zombies Return #4 (October 2009). Although he experiences a brief return to morality in Marvel Zombies 2, throughout most of the series he is presented as being comfortable with his transformation, noting to a captured Black Panther that he thinks he might still eat people even if he was cured of the infection, and setting out to consume a new universe even after learning that the hunger can be beaten. He is opposed in his expansion efforts by the zombie Spider-Man, who finally manages to defeat his own forces with nanites configured to 'eat' zombie flesh.

MC2
The MC2 imprint title A-Next, set in a futuristic alternate universe, features Henry Pym and Janet Pym's twin children (Hope Pym and Henry Pym Jr.), who have turned into the supervillains Red Queen and Big Man respectively.

Earth-5012
In this reality, Hank Pym is an intelligent, Hulk-like brute.

Old Man Logan
In the post-apocalyptic Old Man Logan storyline that takes place on Earth-807128, Hank Pym (as Giant-Man) is one of the numerous superheroes killed by the Red Skull's army of villains. Decades after his demise, a Connecticut settlement called "Pym Falls" is built around his massive skeleton. In addition, his Ant-Man helmet is shown in the possession of a young boy named Dwight, who uses it to command an army of ants to enforce the payment of tolls across a bridge.

In the pages of "Old Man Logan" that takes place on Earth-21923, it was shown that during the fight in Connecticut that Giant-Man had become enraged when the Wasp was killed by Hobgoblin. This led him to crush Vulture with his hands and step on Crossbones. As he charged the villains, Avalanche used his abilities to shake the ground. Moloids emerged and attack Giant-Man, causing him to fall to the ground.

Ultimate Marvel
The Ultimate Marvel imprint version of Henry "Hank" Pym is portrayed as a brilliant but mentally fragile scientist. He takes Prozac to battle his mental instability and depressive episodes. He gains his Giant-Man abilities after transfusing the blood of his mutant wife Janet Pym. The character is expelled from the Ultimates after his abusive behavior ends his marriage and his Giant-Man serum is used by S.H.I.E.L.D. to make an entire Giant-Men team. Now a pariah, he briefly joins with both pseudo heroes and then anti-American villains in his Ant-Man persona. The character eventually rejoins the Ultimates in his Yellowjacket identity. During the events of "Ultimatum" storyline, he sacrifices himself against the Multiple Man's suicide bomber duplicates to save the remaining Ultimates' lives.

After his death, the character's various formulas/devices are still in usage: the Giant-Man formula further replicated by S.H.I.E.L.D. to have multiple Giant-Women agents while his technology is eventually acquired by HYDRA.

Giant-Man was later revived alongside his fellow Ultimates when the Superflow that separated the different universes was destroyed by the Maker and the High Evolutionary.

After Earth-1610 was restored, Giant-Man was seen with the Ultimates when they help Spider-Man fight the Green Goblin.

Marvel Adventures
Henry Pym appears in issue 13 of Marvel Adventures: The Avengers as a scientist working for Janet's father with no superhero identity, and was the one who gave his wife superpowers. He is visited by Spider-Man and Storm when Janet van Dyne (Giant-Girl in this continuity) falls under insect mind-control. He tells them how to free her (severing the antennae on her mask), gives her a new costume, and uses an insect telepathy helmet (identical to his Earth-616 Ant-Man helmet) to create an illusion of several giant-sized people, scaring the insects away. He returns in issue 20, becoming Ant-Man. He not only joins the team but begins a relationship with Janet.

Marvel Apes
In the Marvel Apes universe, Henry Pym is a gorilla named Gro-Rilla, a member of the Ape-Vengers.

Heroes Reborn (2021)
In the 2021 Heroes Reborn reality, Hank Pym is a scientist and a devoted Christian who is a former friend and sidekick of Hyperion. When he got consumed by his cybernetic experiments, Hank figuratively and literally was transformed into Ultron which forced Hyperion to banish him to the Negative Zone. Ultron was among the inmates who escaped from the Negative Zone. Hyperion defeated Ultron by dismantling him.

In other media

Television
 Hank Pym as Ant-Man and Giant-Man appears in The Marvel Super Heroes, voiced by Tom Harvey.
 Hank Pym as Ant-Man appears in a 1979 Saturday Night Live sketch, portrayed by Garrett Morris.
 Hank Pym as Goliath makes a non-speaking cameo appearance in the X-Men episode "One Man's Worth (Part 1)". This version is a member of the Avengers who hails from an alternate timeline where Professor X was killed before the X-Men's formation.
 Hank Pym as Ant-Man and Giant-Man appeared in The Avengers: United They Stand, voiced by Rod Wilson. This version is the Avengers' leader.
 Hank Pym as Ant-Man appears in the Fantastic Four: World's Greatest Heroes episode "World's Tiniest Heroes", voiced by John Payne. This version is a friend of Mister Fantastic's.
 Hank Pym as Ant-Man appears in The Super Hero Squad Show episode "This Forest Green!", voiced by Greg Grunberg.
 Hank Pym as Ant-Man, Giant-Man, and Yellowjacket appears in The Avengers: Earth's Mightiest Heroes, voiced by Wally Wingert. This version is initially a pacifist as Ant-Man/Giant-Man while being a founding member of the Avengers, and later has a fearless yet violent outlook as Yellowjacket.
 Hank Pym as Giant-Man appears in Marvel Disk Wars: The Avengers, voiced by Yasunori Masutani.
 Hank Pym appears in Ant-Man (2017), voiced by Dee Bradley Baker. This version is based on the Marvel Cinematic Universe version (see below).
 Hank Pym makes a cameo appearance in the Marvel Future Avengers episode "The Rage of Black Bolt".

Film
 Hank Pym as Giant-Man and Ant-Man appears in Ultimate Avengers and Ultimate Avengers 2, voiced by Nolan North. He joins the Ultimates in fighting Chitauri invasions until he is killed.
 Hank Pym as Giant-Man makes a non-speaking appearance in Next Avengers: Heroes of Tomorrow. He was killed by Ultron alongside the other Avengers prior to the film.

Marvel Cinematic Universe

Hank Pym appears in media set in the Marvel Cinematic Universe (MCU), portrayed by Michael Douglas, with Dax Griffin and John Michael Morris serving as Douglas' younger body doubles in flashback sequences. This version originally operated as Ant-Man and an agent of S.H.I.E.L.D. decades earlier until his wife Janet van Dyne / Wasp seemingly died during one of their missions and he discovered S.H.I.E.L.D.'s attempts to recreate his Pym Particle formula and resigned. In the present, he recruits Scott Lang to be the new Ant-Man, help his daughter Hope van Dyne as the new Wasp, rescue Janet from the Quantum Realm, and become a victim of the Blip. Pym is introduced in the live-action film Ant-Man (2015), and makes subsequent appearances in the live-action films Ant-Man and the Wasp (2018), Avengers: Endgame (2019), and Ant-Man and the Wasp: Quantumania (2023). Additionally, Douglas voices alternate timeline versions of Pym in the Disney+ animated series, What If...?, with one version being Yellowjacket.

Video games
 Hank Pym as Giant-Man appeared as an assist character in Avengers in Galactic Storm.
 Hank Pym appears as an NPC in Marvel: Ultimate Alliance, voiced by Jerry Houser.
 Hank Pym as Yellowjacket appears as a boss in Marvel: Ultimate Alliance 2, voiced again by Wally Wingert.
 Hank Pym as Ant-Man makes a cameo appearance in Ultimate Marvel vs. Capcom 3.
 Hank Pym as Ant-Man and Giant-Man appear as separate playable characters in Marvel Super Hero Squad Online.
 Hank Pym appears as an unlockable character in Marvel: Avengers Alliance.
 Hank Pym appears as an NPC in Marvel Heroes, voiced again by Wally Wingert. Additionally, his Ant-Man design appears as an enhanced costume for Scott Lang / Ant-Man. 
 Hank Pym as Ant-Man appears in Lego Marvel Super Heroes, voiced by Nolan North.
 Hank Pym as Ant-Man appears in Lego Marvel's Avengers.
 Hank Pym as Ant-Man appears as a team-up character in Disney Infinity: Marvel Super Heroes.
 Hank Pym's fusion with Ultron appears as a playable character in Marvel: Future Fight, with Giant-Man and Goliath appearing as alternate skins.
 Hank Pym appears as an unlockable character in Marvel Avengers Academy, voiced by Christopher McCullough.
 Hank Pym as Giant-Man, Ant-Man, and Yellowjacket appear as separate playable characters in Lego Marvel Super Heroes 2, voiced by Dar Dash. In the game's story mode, Pym as Giant-Man attends a victory wrap party at Avengers Mansion until Kang the Conqueror brings Manhattan into Chronopolis. Ever since, Giant-Man has been working to find a way to defeat Kang and get every location he took back to their respectful places across time and space. In a bonus mission, A-Bomb, the Hulk, and Wonder Man work to rescue Pym as Ant-Man from his future self who is Yellowjacket.
 Hank Pym appears as an NPC in Marvel's Avengers. This version originally operated as Ant-Man before A.I.M. altered his physiology so that any attempt to shrink himself would be fatal. Following this, he became the leader of the Resistance to rescue Inhumans from A.I.M. and give them sanctuary in his base, the Ant Hill.
 Hank Pym appears in Marvel Future Revolution, voiced again by Wally Wingert. This version is a scientist for Omega Flight. Additionally, an alternate reality version of Pym as Yellowjacket makes an appearance.

Miscellaneous 
 Hank Pym appears in Peter David's novelization of Spider-Man 2. He attends Dr. Otto Octavius's first experiment with his mechanical arms. After the experiment goes awry, Pym confirms he is alive and implies his wife Rosalie is dead.
 The MCU version of Hank Pym serves as the namesake of the Pym Test Kitchen and Pym Tasting Lab restaurant attractions within Avengers Campus at Disney California Adventure.

Collected editions

Notes

References

External links
 Ant-Man at the Superhero Database
 
 Ant-Man at Don Markstein's Toonopedia. Archived from the original on 4 April 2012.

Ant-Man
Avengers (comics) characters
Characters created by Jack Kirby
Characters created by Larry Lieber
Characters created by Stan Lee
Comics characters introduced in 1962
Fictional characters from Nebraska
Fictional characters who can change size
Fictional characters with bipolar disorder
Fictional characters with dissociative identity disorder
Fictional chemists
Fictional domestic abusers
Fictional entomologists
Male characters in film
Marvel Comics American superheroes
Marvel Comics film characters
Marvel Comics male superheroes
Marvel Comics mutates
Marvel Comics scientists
Marvel Comics telepaths